The Goodwin Nunataks are a small group of isolated nunataks lying about  west of the Marshall Mountains of Antarctica, at the south side of Walcott Neve. They were named by the Advisory Committee on Antarctic Names after Michael L. Goodwin, a United States Antarctic Research Program geomagmetist and seismologist at South Pole Station, 1960.

References

Nunataks of the Ross Dependency
Shackleton Coast